When the Bough Breaks may refer to:

Literature 
 "When the bough breaks the cradle will fall", a line from the nursery rhyme "Rock-a-bye Baby"
 When the Bough Breaks and Other Stories, a 1924 collection of short stories by Naomi Mitchison
 When the Bough Breaks (Duncan novel), a 1973 novel by Lois Duncan
 When the Bough Breaks (Kellerman novel), a 1985 novel by Jonathan Kellerman
 When the Bough Breaks, a 1993 novel by Mercedes Lackey and Holly Lisle

Film and television 
 When the Bough Breaks (1947 film), a British film directed by Lawrence Huntington
 When the Bough Breaks (1986 film), a television adaptation of Jonathan Kellerman's novel, starring Ted Danson
 When the Bough Breaks (1993 film), a thriller by Michael Cohn
 When the Bough Breaks (2016 film), a psychological thriller film by Jon Cassar
 "When the Bough Breaks" (Castle), an episode of Castle
 "When the Bough Breaks" (Star Trek: The Next Generation), an episode of Star Trek: The Next Generation
 "When the Bough Breaks" (Haven), an episode of Haven

Music 
 When the Bough Breaks (album), a 1997 album by Bill Ward

See also
 Down Will Come Baby, a 1999 American television film
 When the Wind Blows (disambiguation)